Under the Top is a 1919 American silent comedy film directed by Donald Crisp, written by John Emerson, Gardner Hunting, and Anita Loos, and starring Fred Stone, Ella Hall, Lester Le May, Sylvia Ashton, James Cruze, and Guy Oliver. It was released on January 5, 1919, by Paramount Pictures.

Only a fragment of this film has managed to survive.

Plot

Cast
Fred Stone as Jimmie Jones
Ella Hall as Pansy O'Neill
Lester Le May as Terry O'Neill
Sylvia Ashton as Lotta Crust
James Cruze as 'Foxy' Stillmore
Guy Oliver as Jay Trimmer
Charles Stanton Ogle as Otto B. Shott
Noah Beery, Sr. as Prof. De Como
J. Cummings as Justice of the Peace
Jane Wolfe as Mrs. Jones 
Julia N. Stark as Wardrobe lady

References

External links 
 
 

1919 films
1919 comedy films
Paramount Pictures films
Films directed by Donald Crisp
American black-and-white films
American silent feature films
Lost American films
1910s English-language films
1910s American films
Silent American comedy films